Edéa is a city located along the Sanaga River in Cameroon's Littoral Region. It lies on the Douala–Yaoundé railway line. Its population was estimated at 122,300 in 2001.  There are bauxite facilities, aluminium processing facility, steel processing facility, timber facilities, paper facilities. These are primarily powered by the  Edea Hydroelectric Power Station. Bananas, oil palm, and cacao are farmed nearby.

Notable residents
Basketball player Ruben Boumtje-Boumtje was born here in 1978 and peace activist Maximilienne Ngo Mbe went to school here.

Transport 
The city is served by the Cameroon Railway, which crosses the Sanaga River at this point.

In September, 2007, a branch railway to the port of Kribi was proposed, on account of it having deeper water than Douala.

See also 
 Communes of Cameroon
 Transport in Cameroon

References 

Populated places in Littoral Region (Cameroon)